"Street Dreams" is a 1996 single by American rapper Nas. The song was It Was Written's second single, following "If I Ruled the World (Imagine That)". "Street Dreams" contains an interpolation from the Eurythmics song "Sweet Dreams (Are Made of This)" and a sample from Linda Clifford's "Never Gonna Stop". A remix, including an appearance by R. Kelly, was released shortly after the original. It featured samples from the Isley Brothers' "Choosey Lover" along with some elements from Marvin Gaye's "Mercy Mercy Me."  The remix version was performed live on an episode of the Nickelodeon series All That in February 1997.

The song's big-budget video, directed by Hype Williams, was an allusion to the Martin Scorsese film Casino. It was filmed in Las Vegas around the time Tupac Shakur was murdered and featured a cameo appearance by Frank Vincent. Kenya Moore of The Real Housewives of Atlanta is also featured in the video.

The song was Nas's first to enter the top 50 on the Billboard Hot 100, reaching number 22. It was certified Gold by the Recording Industry Association of America on January 8, 1997.

Music video
There is a music video for both the original and the remix featuring R. Kelly. The original music video was directed by Hype Williams and was filmed in September 1996. It was released in the fall of 1996. The music video was released for the week ending on October 6, 1996. The video is an homage to Casino (film) and features Frank Vincent. The video contains an additional sample of Love Is Strange by Mickey & Sylvia, which can be heard at the beginning and at the end of the song.

Single track listing

A-Side
 "Street Dreams" (Album Version) (4:08) 
 "Street Dreams" (Bonus Verse) (4:08) 
 "Street Dreams" (Instrumental) (4:08)

B-Side
 "Affirmative Action" (Remix) (4:09) 
Produced by Poke & Tone 
 "Affirmative Action" (Album Version) (4:19) 
Produced by Dave Atkinson
 "Affirmative Action" (Instrumental) (3:44)

Charts

Certifications

References

1996 singles
Music videos directed by Hype Williams
Nas songs
Songs written by Nas
1996 songs
Songs written by David A. Stewart
Songs written by Annie Lennox
Songs written by Samuel Barnes (songwriter)
Songs about drugs